The Canal Street railroad bridge (or Pennsylvania Railroad bridge) is a vertical-lift bridge across the south branch of the Chicago River in Chicago, Illinois. It was designated a Chicago Landmark on December 12, 2007.

Construction
The present bridge was constructed for the Pennsylvania Railroad to replace a two-track swing bridge at the same location. The necessity to allow both continued use of the swing bridge and unimpeded river traffic during building work complicated construction of the bridge. The chosen solution was to construct the bridge in the raised position above the old bridge, then demolish the old bridge once construction was completed. The bridge was designed by Waddell & Harrington, and fabricated and erected by the Pennsylvania Steel Company.

Construction of the south tower began on September 4, 1913. The bridge was built from steel and metal.

Operation
The bridge carries two railroad tracks across the Chicago River at an angle of about 40 degrees to the center line of the river. Upon completion, the  main span could be raised  in about 45 seconds. By 1916, each day the bridge was crossed by about 300 trains, and was raised for river traffic about 75 times.

Trivia 
When it was constructed in 1914, its 1500-ton main span was the heaviest of any vertical lift bridge in the United States. It is the only vertical-lift bridge across the Chicago River.

Photo gallery

See also
List of bridges documented by the Historic American Engineering Record in Illinois

References

External links

Bridges in Chicago
Bridges completed in 1914
Historic American Engineering Record in Chicago
Chicago Landmarks
Lower West Side, Chicago
Pennsylvania Railroad bridges
Railroad bridges in Illinois
Steel bridges in the United States